This list of École Polytechnique faculty includes current and former professors of École Polytechnique, a French scientific higher education institution established during the French Revolution in 1794 in Paris and moved to Palaiseau in 1976.

Faculty

References 

Polytechnique